Crush is the fourth LP by Abe Vigoda. It was released on Bella Union on September 20, 2010.   Pitchfork Media placed it at number 40 on its list "The Top 50 Albums of 2010".

Track listing
 "Sequins" - 4:20
 "Dream of My Love (Chasing After You)" – 4:17
 "Throwing Shade" – 3:35
 "Crush" – 4:35
 "November" - 2:51
 "Pure Violence" – 3:44
 "Repeating Angel" – 6:07
 "To Tears" – 3:16
 "Beverly Slope" - 3:15
 "We Have to Mask" – 4:36

References

2010 albums